Lukáš Jánošík (born 5 March 1994) is a Slovak professional footballer who plays for Zemplín Michalovce in the Slovak Fortuna Liga as a winger.

Club career

MŠK Žilina
He made his professional Fortuna Liga debut for Žilina against Ružomberok on 7 November 2015. In the game he was featured in the starting line-up, but was replaced  16 minutes before the end of the game by later international Jaroslav Mihalík. Šošoni won the game 2-0.

Jánošík was released from MŠK Žilina, as the club had entered liquidation, due to a coronavirus pandemic.

Dynamo České Budějovice
On 1 June 2020, Dynamo České Budějovice had announced, that Jánošík will join the south-Czech club on a three-year agreement, at the start of the 2020/21 season.

Zemplín Michalovce
Following hsi release from Žilina after his second spell with the club, in June 2022 Jánošík signed with Zemplín Michalovce after being lured into the club by the manager Norbert Hrnčár.

Honours

MŠK Žilina
Fortuna Liga: Winners: 2016-17

References

External links
 MŠK Žilina official profile 
 Futbalnet profile 
 

1994 births
Living people
Slovak footballers
Slovak expatriate footballers
Association football forwards
MŠK Žilina players
MŠK Rimavská Sobota players
MFK Tatran Liptovský Mikuláš players
SK Dynamo České Budějovice players
MFK Zemplín Michalovce players
Slovak Super Liga players
2. Liga (Slovakia) players
Czech First League players
Expatriate footballers in the Czech Republic
Slovak expatriate sportspeople in the Czech Republic